Ibex Pass [el. ] is a mountain pass in the Sperry Hills of Central-Southern California in the United States.

The pass is at the summit in a range of desert hills between the Baker area and the Shoshone area and is located on the border of Inyo County and San Bernardino County. The pass connects Interstate 15 with access to Death Valley National Park, and it is traversed by State Route 127.

Mountain passes of California
Landforms of Inyo County, California
Landforms of San Bernardino County, California